The Webber Independent School) is a coeducational independent school situated in Stantonbury, in the north of Milton Keynes, England, owned by GEMS Education. The school teaches children from the age of 6 months through to 16 years.

The school is located approximately 2 miles north of Central Milton Keynes.

History
The school opened in Newport Pagnell in 1970 before moving in 1987 to its current purpose built site in Stantonbury in the north of Milton Keynes. In 2010 current and former pupils produced an exhibition chronicling the history of the school and the former Knoll School (1892-1974). The Knoll School buildings at Aspley Guise were home to the Bury Lawn senior school between 1977-1987. Bury Lawn was renamed the Webber Independent School in September 2011 in honour of the urban designer and 'father of the city' of Milton Keynes, Melvin M. Webber.

The school previously had a sixth-form, but closed this in 2019.

References

External links
http://www.webberindependentschool.com/
Official school blog
Official website of GEMS, the school's operator

Private schools in Milton Keynes
GEMS schools
Educational institutions established in 1970
1970 establishments in England